The following is a list of notable events and releases of the year 1990 in Norwegian music.

Events

April
 6 – The 17th Vossajazz started in Voss, Norway (April 6 – 8).

May
 23 – The 18th Nattjazz started in Bergen, Norway (May 23 – June 3).

June
 28 – The 21st Kalvøyafestivalen started at Kalvøya near by Oslo (June 30 – July 1).

Albums released

Unknown date

A
 Arild Andersen
 Sagn (Kirkelig Kulturverksted)

G
 Jan Garbarek
 I Took Up the Runes (ECM Records)

Deaths

 February
 2 – Sigbjørn Bernhoft Osa, Hardanger fiddler and traditional folk musician (born 1910).

 June
 28 – Per Bergersen, songwriter and illustrator, murder victim (born 1960).

 December
 24 – Thorbjørn Egner, playwright, songwriter and illustrator (born 1912).

Births

 January
 4 – Bjørn Johan Muri, pop singer.

 February
 2 – Patrik Svendsen, heavy metal vocalist, rhythm guitarist, songwriter, and music producer, Tonic Breed.
 16 – Eldbjørg Hemsing, classical and traditional folk violinist.

 Mars 
 25 – Alexandra Joner, pop singer.

 May
 8 – Ingebjørg Bratland, folk singer, kveder and artist.
 9 – Hanne Leland, electro-pop artist and songwriter.

June
 20 – Iselin Solheim, singer and songwriter.

 July
 11 – Ole Mofjell, jazz drummer.
 23
 Dagny Norvoll Sandvik, pop singer.
 Torgeir Standal, jazz guitarist

 October
 25 – Marthe Wang, Norwegian singer and songwriter.

 November
 27 – Mette Henriette, independent saxophonist, improviser and autodidact composer.

 Unknown date
 Charlotte Dos Santos, jazz vocalist, composer, and arranger.

See also
 1990 in Norway
 Music of Norway
 Norway in the Eurovision Song Contest 1990

References

 
Norwegian music
Norwegian
Music
1990s in Norwegian music